Ernest West may refer to:

Ernest West (politician) (1907–?), Australian politician
Ernest E. West (1931–2021), American soldier
Ernest E. West (American football) (1867–1914), American football player and coach